Walter van de Vijver (born November 1955) was the head of exploration and production at Royal Dutch Shell. He was dismissed in 2004 following a scandal about the size of the company's reserves.

References

Dutch businesspeople
Shell plc people
1955 births
Living people